Daniel Straus may refer to:

 Daniel E. Straus (born 1957), American businessman, entrepreneur, real estate developer, philanthropist and minority owner of the Memphis Grizzlies
 Daniel Straus (MMA) (born 1984), American featherweight mixed martial arts fighter
Daniel B. Straus (chemist), winner of a 2021 Blavatnik Award